Glen Innes Wind Farm  is a wind farm proposal in the Australian state of New South Wales. It is in the New England region of northern New South Wales, between Inverell and Glen Innes. It is south of the Gwydir Highway and closer to Glen Innes than the larger nearby White Rock and Sapphire Wind Farms. It is expected to be built with 25 wind turbines, each with a capacity up to 3.6MW.

References

Wind farms in New South Wales